Mayte Martín (born in Barcelona, Spain, April 19, 1965) is a Flamenco cantaora (singer), bolero singer, and composer.

Early life 

Martín started singing as a small child, and, at the age of 10, she won an amateur singing contest organized by a supermarket. After this, she started performing regularly as an amateur at the peñas flamencas in Barcelona and its outskirts, and became a professional at the age of 16. In the meantime, she acquired a solid knowledge of flamenco styles, mainly by listening intensively to recordings of flamenco cantaores like Juan Valderrama, Manolo Caracol, Camarón de la Isla, Lole Montoya and most of all, Pastora Pavón, also known as La Niña de los Peines. She also received some formal musical training, and practiced her skills as a "cantaora de atrás" (singer for flamenco dance).

Career 
In 1987, she won the first prize or Lámpara Minera at the Concurso Nacional de La Unión (also known as Festival de las Minas). Two years later, she won the Antonio Chacón Prize (bestowed on the best malagueña at the Concurso Nacional de Arte Flamenco de Córdoba). At the same time, she started an international career after being chosen by Peter Gabriel to perform at Womad Festivals. In 1994, she recorded her first album, Muy Frágil, with guitarist Chicuelo and arrangements by Joan Albert Amargós (the later a regular contributor to other well-known flamenco musicians like Paco de Lucía and Camarón de la Isla). In 2000, she published her second flamenco recording, 'Querencia', which was nominated for the Latin Grammy Award to the Best Flamenco Album in 2001.

Although already well-established as a solo cantaora, she resumed her work as a singer for dance when she met bailaora Belén Maya in 1996, with whom she has toured the world with the works Mayte Martín + Belén Maya (since 1996) and Flamenco de Cámara (since 2003), winning international critical acclaim.

In 1997, she received the Barcelona City Award, granted by the City Council, and the National Music Award in the category of "Best Flamenco Composer".

In 1993, she started touring with jazz pianist Tete Montoliu, a professional relationship that lasted until Montoliu's death in 1997. Together, they offered a personal view on boleros in their live recording 'Free Boleros', recorded in 1996. In her second bolero recording, 'Tiempo de Amar', (2002), Omara Portuondo appeared as a guest artist in some of the tracks.

In 2005, she celebrated her 30 years as a performing artist at the Palau de la Música Catalana, with a   entitled 'Mis 30 años de amor al Arte', with which she is now touring Spain and other European countries.

In June 2006, she takes part in an homage tour for Leonard Cohen together with Martiriio, Kiko Veneno, Javier Colis and Luz Casal, with a Spanish version of "Hey, That's no Way to Say Goodbye". The tour was later recorded in a CD called "According to Leonard Cohen".

In 2007, she was requested by classical pianists duo Katia and Marielle Labeque for a project involving Spanish and classical music, which toured for several years. Other musicians like Joan Albert Amargos and Lluis Vidal who composed the arrangements for two pianos. The recording included traditional songs as well as compositions by Manuel de Falla, Federico García Lorca, Enrique Granados, Joaquín Rodrigo, Paco de Lucía, and by Mayte Martín herself.

In 2009, she was requested by poet José Luis Ortiz Nuevo to compose music for the poems of Malaga-born poet Manuel Alcantara, for the flamenco festival of Málaga, which later became the CD Al cantar a Manuel, recorded with guitarists José Luis Montón and Juan Ramón Caro, percussionist Chico Fargas, among other musicians.

In 2012, after breaking all ties with the recording industry, she decides to make a new recording with the help of crowdfunding, through the crowd financing portal Verkami. On this occasion, she records her live performances of bolero and other Latin American music in the Barcelona Venue Luz de Gas. The recording is issued with the title Cosas de dos.

In 2013, with guitarists Jose Luis Montón and Juan Ramón Caro and percussionist Chico Fargas, she creates a new project for the Barcelona flamenco festival, "Por los muertos del cante", an heterodox reading of traditional flamenco songs.

Her 2018 album Tempo Rubato, is a collaboration with a string quartet.

Critics' reviews 
"A born artist. [...] An important number of cantaores of the younger generation have been influence by her. Her image is closer to that of Camarón or José Mercé than that of a typical woman cantaora, and she sings flamenco with moving sweetness and deep knowledge of the essence." (José Miguel Gamboa and Pedro Calvo, Guía libre del flamenco, 2001)

"The best female flamenco voice of her generation, undoubtedly; the most complete 'cantaora'. She sings everything, and she sings everything well. At this rate, this 'cantaora' [...] will add her name to the great ones in history." (Ángel Álvarez Caballero, La discografía ideal del flamenco, 1995)

Recordings 
Muy Frágil, K-Industria Cultural, 1994
Free Boleros, K-Industria Cultural, 1996
Querencia, Virgin, 2000
Tiempo de Amar, Virgin, 2002
De fuego y de agua, KLM, 2008, with the sisters Katia and Marielle Labèque
Al cantar a Manuel, Nuevos Medios S.A 2009
Cosas de dos, 2012
Tempo Rubato, 2018

References

External links 
Mayte Martin's official Web (in Spanish)  
Mayte Martin's link info on Flamenco World  Contains some audio clips.

1965 births
Living people
Flamenco singers
Spanish women singers
Singers from Barcelona
Women in Latin music